Saru is a village in Rõuge Parish, Võru County in southeastern Estonia. Between 1991–2017 (until the administrative reform of Estonian municipalities) the village was located in Mõniste Parish.

Notable people
Raimond Kolk (1924–1992), poet and writer
Jaan Sarv (1877–1954), mathematician, was born in Leeguste village which is now part of Saru village.

References

Villages in Võru County
Kreis Werro